Johnny Thomas Jr. (born August 3, 1964) is a former American football cornerback who played in the National Football League (NFL) for the Washington Redskins, San Diego Chargers, Cleveland Browns, and the Philadelphia Eagles.  He played college football at Baylor University and was selected in the seventh round of the 1987 NFL Draft.  He also ran track and field at Baylor, winning the NCAA Championship in the 4x400 meters relay in 1985.

References

1964 births
Living people
American football cornerbacks
Baylor Bears football players
Cleveland Browns players
Frankfurt Galaxy players
Philadelphia Eagles players
Players of American football from Houston
San Diego Chargers players
Washington Redskins players